The 12th Golden Horse Awards (Mandarin:第12屆金馬獎) took place on  October 30, 1975, at Zhongshan Hall in Taipei, Taiwan.

Winners and nominees 
Winners are listed first, highlighted in boldface.

References

12th
1975 film awards
1975 in Taiwan